Andy Kerr is a male retired weightlifter who competed for England.

Weightlifting career
Kerr represented England and won a silver medal in the Super Heavyweight +100 kg class, at the 1974 British Commonwealth Games in Christchurch, New Zealand.

References

English male weightlifters
Commonwealth Games medallists in weightlifting
Commonwealth Games silver medallists for England
Weightlifters at the 1974 British Commonwealth Games
20th-century English people
Medallists at the 1974 British Commonwealth Games